The 2005 Las Vegas Gladiators season was the 9th season for the franchise. They finished at 8–8, 3rd in the Western Division.  The Gladiators did not qualify for the playoffs.

Coaching
Ron James entered his first season as the head coach of the Gladiators.

Stats

Offense

Quarterback

Running backs

Wide receivers

Touchdowns

Defense

Special teams

Kick return

Kicking

Las Vegas Gladiators
Las Vegas Gladiators seasons
Las